Hoveyleh (also Romanized as Ḩavīleh) is a village in Chah Salem Rural District, in the Central District of Omidiyeh County, Khuzestan Province, Iran. At the 2006 census, its population was 66, in 9 families.

References 

Populated places in Omidiyeh County